Bangassou Airport  is an airport serving Bangassou, a city on the Mbomou River in the Mbomou prefecture of the Central African Republic. The Mbomou River forms the local border with the Democratic Republic of the Congo.

See also

Transport in the Central African Republic
List of airports in the Central African Republic

References

External links 
OpenStreetMap - Bangassou Airport
SkyVector - Bangassou Airport

Airports in the Central African Republic
Buildings and structures in Mbomou
Bangassou